India Summer is an American pornographic actress and nude model and a member of the AVN and XRCO Halls of Fame. Her stage name is based on the phrase Indian summer. She also has mainstream acting credits.

Career
Summer received her education towards becoming a teacher. She then worked in finance for 6 years before moving to modeling and acting. Summer began working in the adult film industry at the age of 29.

In July 2009, she signed an exclusive girl on girl contract with Girlfriends Films studios.

In November 2011, her debut as a director was announced with the movie Perfect Fit.

The Internet Adult Film Database lists 1,642 performer credits for Summer between 2006 and 2022 (there is some duplication in the listing, but it is also unlikely to be exhaustive). Her busiest period was 2011–2015. Her output has declined markedly since 2020.

Mainstream appearances
Summer has appeared in small roles in the television series Reno 911!, Sons of Anarchy, and Dexter. She also appeared in National Lampoon's 2007 film Homo Erectus.

In 2015, Summer had a starring role in the independent film Marriage 2.0. Although the original version contains explicit sex scenes, the edited version received an NC-17 rating by the Motion Picture Association of America. British writer Gareth May, in an article for the British lifestyle and culture site TheDebrief.co.uk, described the film as "a potential game changer for the porn industry. There are some great performances in the movie. India Summer especially excels, and Nina Hartley's brief role shows she clearly has comedic timing and talent." The unrated version of the film received the Best Narrative award at New York's 2015 CineKink Film Festival.

Awards

References

External links

 
 
 
 

Year of birth missing (living people)
21st-century American actresses
American female adult models
American pornographic film actresses
LGBT adult models
American LGBT actors
Living people